The Astor markhor or flare-horned markhor (Capra falconeri falconeri) is a subspecies of the markhor, native to Kashmir and northern Pakistan. To the west it reaches the easternmost parts of Afghanistan. The range of the Astor markhor is very scattered. At one time considered an "endangered species", conservation efforts have had some success and the largest subpopulation in Pakistan may now exceed 1000 individuals. As a result, the International Union for Conservation of Nature has rated its status as "near-threatened".

Ecology
It seldom goes above the tree line; in summer it feeds largely on grasses and leaves but in winter it mainly browses on shrubs and woody material. One or two kids are born after a gestation period of 135 to 170 days. The goats are hunted by snow leopards, wolves and lynx, and the kids may fall prey to golden eagles.

Status
At one time C. f. falconeri was assessed as being endangered but it is now rated as "near-threatened" as there are now estimated to be more individuals than was thought at one time. The 2011 estimate for the total population is around 5,800 individuals. These are divided into a number of sub-populations, only one of which numbers over 1000 individuals. The main threat it faces is being hunted. Even where the animal is protected by legislation as in Afghanistan, poaching takes place and the ban on hunting is not enforced. In India it is fully protected and is present in three wildlife reserves, the Limber Wildlife Sanctuary, and the Lachipora Wildlife Sanctuary and the Hirapora Wildlife Sanctuary. These three areas are planned to be combined to create the Kazinag National Park in order to protect the Astor markhor and other mammals such as the snow leopard and the Himalayan brown bear. In Pakistan, the Astor markhor is present in a number of different wildlife sanctuaries, including the Naltar Wildlife Sanctuary in the northern part of the country.

References

Capra (genus)
Mammals of Pakistan